Abraham "Abe" Aronovitz (October 15, 1898 – July 11, 1960) was an American lawyer and politician who served one term as mayor of Miami, Florida, from 1953 until 1955. He had a seat on the City Commission until 1958.

Background

Aronovitz was born on October 15, 1898, in New York City. He was one of six sons of Romanian Jewish immigrants, David and Kate Aronovitz.  He was raised in Key West, Florida and graduated from Palm Beach High School.  He graduated from Stetson University.  He later was the uncle of Sidney Aronovitz (1920–1988), the US District Judge for the Southern District of Florida (1976–1988).

Political career
In the 1920s, Aronovitz was living in Jacksonville, Florida, where he became active in politics. He ran for and lost the election for a seat on the Jacksonville city commission.

He moved to Miami, which was developing more rapidly. In 1926 he was appointed as acting State Attorney.  In 1927, he ran for and lost the election for a seat on the City Commission of Miami. In the 1930s he was appointed as Miami City Attorney.

Aronovitz worked in private practice for years. He returned to politics, gaining election as mayor of Miami in 1952, and serving one term from 1953 through 1955.  He was the only Jewish mayor of Miami until the election of Daniella Levine Cava in 2020.

He acted as a mentor to Robert King High, recruiting him to run for mayor. The younger man won election in 1957, and was re-elected for several terms. He was influential in developing plans to guide the growth of Miami.

Aronovitz was elected to a seat on the city Commission, and served until 1958. He had to resign because of health problems.  Several months later he traveled to Cuba with his family. They were staying at the Havana Hilton Hotel in Havana, when the dictatorship of Fulgencio Batista fell on 1 January 1959.

References

 The Miami News; "Young Aronovitz Evoked Rage" by Howard Kleinberg; 21 September 1985.
 The Miami News; "The Late Abe Aronovitz, A frail but Strong Man" by Bill Baggs; 18 August 1960.
 The St. Petersburg Times; "Abe Aronovitz, Former Mayor of Miami Dies;" 12 July 1960, Page 1.

1898 births
1960 deaths
Stetson University alumni
Mayors of Miami
Jewish mayors of places in the United States
American people of Romanian-Jewish descent
20th-century American politicians
Jewish American people in Florida politics
20th-century American Jews